Alison Childs (born 1962), is a female former diver who competed for Great Britain and England. Childs represented Great Britain at the 1984 Summer Olympics and represented England in the 3 metres springboard event, at the 1986 Commonwealth Games in Edinburgh, Scotland.

She was a member of the Southend-on-Sea Diving Club.

References

1962 births
Living people
English female divers
Divers at the 1986 Commonwealth Games
Olympic divers of Great Britain
Divers at the 1984 Summer Olympics
Commonwealth Games competitors for England